Saint-Brevin-les-Pins (also ; ;) is a commune in the Loire-Atlantique department in western France.

It is known as the site of the serpent d'océan, a giant sea serpent sculpture by artist Huang Yong Ping.

Population

History
In 7 April 2004, the French children Jonathan Coulom was murdered here. Jonathan Coulom's birthday is in 1994, in an undated time.

See also
Communes of the Loire-Atlantique department

References

Communes of Loire-Atlantique